The Rundown with Robin Thede was an American late-night talk show and variety television program that premiered on October 12, 2017, on BET. The show was hosted by comedian and writer Robin Thede, the former head writer and correspondent on The Nightly Show with Larry Wilmore. On July 25, 2018, it was announced that BET had canceled the series.

Premise
The Rundown with Robin Thede saw comedian Robin Thede's "take on the week's headlines in politics and pop culture with a fast-paced, no-holds-barred show that featured social commentary, sketch comedy and pop culture parodies."

Production

Background
Thede was a head writer and performer on The Nightly Show with Larry Wilmore. From 2015–16, she was the head writer for the first season and a half of The Nightly Show, the first African-American woman to hold that position on any late-night talk show.

Development
Two weeks after The Nightly Show was canceled in August 2016, Thede partnered with production company Jax Media to produce an independently financed pilot for a weekly show that would integrate her comedic takes on headlines with sketches, musical performances, and documentary-style segments. Soon thereafter, Chris Rock became involved in the production, the pilot was produced, and it was quickly sold to BET.

On April 26, 2017, it was announced that BET had given the production a series order for a first season consisting of 24 episodes. Executive producers were reported to include Robin Thede, Chris Rock, and Tony Hernandez. On July 25, 2018, it was announced that BET had declined to renew the series for a second season, effectively canceling it.

Podcast
The show had a podcast aftershow, entitled The Ran-down, that was released every Thursday after an episode airs on television. Each episode of the podcast featured a surprise celebrity guest, something the television show didn't feature often due to time constraints.

Episodes
</onlyinclude>

Reception
The Rundown with Robin Thede met with a positive response from critics. On the review aggregation website Rotten Tomatoes, its sole season holds a 100% approval rating with an average rating of 9 out of 10 based on 5 reviews. Metacritic, which uses a weighted average, assigned the season a score of 78 out of 100 based on 4 critics, indicating "generally favorable reviews".

References

External links

2010s American black television series
2010s American late-night television series
2010s American satirical television series
2010s American sketch comedy television series
2010s American television news shows
2010s American variety television series
2017 American television series debuts
2018 American television series endings
American news parodies
BET original programming
Television shows filmed in New York City